The Blue Springs Formation is a geologic formation exposed in the Los Pinos Mountains of central New Mexico.

Description
The formation consists of almost  of metasedimentary rock. The lower beds are massive gray to red slate and siltstone, while the central portion mostly is greenish sericite schist with occasional slate and siltstone beds. The uppermost beds are again red to gray slate. The formation is underlain by the Sais Quartzite and overlain by Phanerozoic units. The  middle schist is interpreted as a metarhyolite (a metamorphosed rhyolite).

The crystallization age of the formation is placed at 1588 ± 7 million years (Ma), corresponding to the earliest Calymmian period of the Mesoproterozoic.

History of investigation
The formation was originally described as the Blue Springs schist by J.T. Stark and E.C. Dapples in 1946 and named for Blue Springs, a seepage area just north of Highway 60. The formation was first assigned to the Manzano Group in 2006.

See also

 List of fossiliferous stratigraphic units in New Mexico
 Paleontology in New Mexico

References

Permian formations of New Mexico
Precambrian formations of New Mexico